St. Thomas University (also St. Thomas or STU) is a  Catholic, English-language liberal arts university located in Fredericton, New Brunswick, Canada. It is a primarily undergraduate university offering bachelor's degrees in the arts (humanities and social sciences), education, and social work to approximately 1,900 students. The average class size is 30 and no class is larger than 60.

The university offers a number of unique programs including recognized majors in Criminology, Journalism, Human Rights, and Communications and Public Policy. St. Thomas is the home of the Frank McKenna Centre for Communications and Public Policy. The university is unique in Canada for its sole focus on liberal arts and its commitment to social justice.

St. Thomas' notable alumni includes a Canadian prime minister, Brian Mulroney, a New Brunswick premier, Shawn Graham, federal and provincial cabinet ministers, prelates, university presidents as well as several Rhodes Scholars.

History

St. Thomas University traces its institutional origins to the establishment of a Catholic academy in the former community of Chatham, New Brunswick (now Miramichi) in the late nineteenth century. Due to an influx of Irish immigration in northwestern New Brunswick, Chatham saw a need for more centres of education and religious instruction. Officially opened in October 1860, St. Michael's Academy was inaugurated by Bishop James Rogers of the newly formed Diocese of Chatham.

St. Michael's Academy catered to young English-speaking males in the Miramichi River Valley and the growing port town of Chatham. A women's academy was created a year later. St. Michael's consisted of a single wooden structure constructed near the seat of the Diocese of Chatham, the new St. Michael's Cathedral. The institution offered a classical education and was intended to prepare students to study for the diocesan priesthood. From 1865, the school was known as St. Michael's College. It closed for several years in the 1870s and 1880s.

Its uneven operation was curbed by the Basilian Fathers, a religious order who assumed the administration of the College in 1910. Since the Toronto-based religious order already had a Catholic college in the Ontario capital, named St. Michael's College (a federated component of the University of Toronto), St. Michael's in Chatham was renamed St. Thomas College after Thomas Aquinas. It remained a high school and a junior college; however, in 1934 the institution gained degree granting status from the Government of New Brunswick.

After 1923, the Basilian Fathers transferred the administration of the college to the Diocese of Chatham. The diocese was restructured as the Diocese of Bathurst. Its seat was moved to the primarily francophone community, Bathurst, north of Chatham. While St. Thomas College remained in Chatham, its future remained uncertain. In 1959, the college was subject to territorial changes in the reorganized Diocese of Bathurst. English-speaking parishes and the college were transferred to the Diocese of Saint John with its seat in New Brunswick's major port city. The Bishop of Saint John became the Chancellor of St. Thomas.  By mid-century, the economic and social significance of post-secondary institutions saw an increased role of state intervention. In 1960, the institution was renamed St. Thomas University by an act of the New Brunswick Legislature.  Under the government of Louis Robichaud, the Royal Commission on Higher Education was launched. Headed by John James Deutsch, a professor and administrator from Queen's University, the commission recommended greater centralization and public funding in post-secondary education.

Arising from the Commission's recommendations, St. Thomas University was encouraged to relocate to the campus of the University of New Brunswick in Fredericton to share facilities. Not without controversy and animosity, St. Thomas University moved to the provincial capital and abandoned its secondary school curriculum. A new campus was built in the Neo-Georgian style by the architects of the University of New Brunswick (Larson & Larson) to complement the campus of its institutional neighbour. It officially welcomed students in October 1964.

Today, St. Thomas University has been subject to the pervasive effects of secularization that has seen the university depart from much of its rich tradition of Catholic higher education and scholarship , St. Thomas University remains the only exclusive liberal arts university in Canada.

Relationship with UNB

St. Thomas University and the University of New Brunswick's Fredericton campus are located in the College Hill neighbourhood in Fredericton. The two institutions share facilities for their student unions, libraries, athletics, and a common heating plant and building maintenance services. Students from STU are permitted to take a certain number of classes at UNB and vice versa.  However, STU and UNBF itself are financially and academically separate. STU is able to offer many amenities other smaller schools cannot, in large part to its UNB partnership. The two universities enjoy a good-natured rivalry.

Academics

STU offers the following programmes to students:
Bachelor of Arts, Bachelor of Applied Arts, Bachelor of Education, Bachelor of Social Work.

STU offers the following degrees to students:
Anthropology, Catholic Studies, Communications and Public Policy, Criminology & Criminal Justice, Economics, Education, English Language and Literature (with the option to additionally concentrate in Creative Writing or Drama), Environment and Society, Fine Arts, French, Gerontology, Great Books, History, Human Rights, Humanities, Interdisciplinary Studies, International Relations, Irish Studies, Journalism, Mathematics, Media Studies, Native Studies, Philosophy, Political Science, Psychology, Religious Studies, Romance Languages, Science and Technology Studies, Social Work, Sociology, Spanish, Women's Studies and Gender Studies.

Athletics
STU offers the following athletic programs for men:
basketball, cross-country, soccer, and volleyball. 
STU offers the following athletic programs for women:
basketball, cross country, soccer, volleyball, rugby, and hockey.
Collectively, the St Thomas Tommies have won 41 ACAA titles and 2 AUS titles. Throughout these athletic endeavours STU has maintained an excellent academic status with 371 national scholars and 397 academic all-Canadians.

Scholarships and bursaries

The Government of Canada sponsors an Aboriginal Bursaries Search Tool that lists over 680 scholarships, bursaries, and other incentives offered by governments, universities, and industry to support Aboriginal post-secondary participation. St. Thomas University scholarships for Aboriginal, First Nations and Métis students include: ATV Media Scholarship.

Research

At St. Thomas University, there are 6 focal areas of research: qualitative analysis, human rights and social justice, New Brunswick studies/Atlantic region, narrative studies, global and international studies, and on learning and teaching. The university holds Canada Research Chairs (with the associated research centres) in New Brunswick studies, social justice, qualitative analysis, and narrative. The university is home to the Centre for Interdisciplinary Research on Narrative.

Campus life

There are six academic buildings on campus housing classrooms and faculty offices. They are: James Dunn Hall, Edmund Casey Hall, George Martin Hall, Brian Mulroney Hall, Holy Cross House, and Margaret Norrie McCain Hall.

James Dunn Hall also contains  Tim Hortons and Subway restaurants. Further, it contains the wall of flags on which flags representing the nationalities of all international students are represented 

George Martin Hall contains a Meal hall that makes use of an All-You-Care-To-Eat model. Meal plans are available to students and range from 10 meals a week to unlimited dining. 

STU's athletic facility is called the J.B. O'Keefe Centre. 

There are three residence buildings at St. Thomas University. All three (Harrington Hall, Vanier Hall, and Holy Cross House) are located on campus. 

The university maintains its own campus police force. Campus police members are students who are hired annually by the University to maintain security at campus events. The student newspaper, The Aquinian, is available on campus and around the city during the regular academic year.

Chancellors

Bishop of Chatham (1910–1938) after Bishop of Bathurst (1938–1959)
 Thomas Francis Barry, 1910–1920
 Patrice Alexandre Chiasson, C.I.M., 1920–1942 
 Camille-André LeBlanc, 1942–1959
Bishop of Saint John (1959–2019)
 A.B. Leverman, 1959–1968
 Joseph Neil MacNeil, 1969–1973 
 Arthur Gilbert, 1974–1986
 J. Edward Troy, 1986–1997
 J. Faber MacDonald, C.S.C, 1998–2006
 Martin William Currie, (acting chancellor), 2006–2007
 Robert Harris, 2007–2019
lay Chancellors (2020–Present)
Graydon Nicholas, since 2020

Presidents and Vice Chancellors

Nicholas Roche, C.S.B., 1910–1911
William J. Roach, C.S.B., 1911–1919 
Frederick Meader, C.S.B., 1920–1923 
Raymond Hawkes, 1923–1927
James M. Hill, D.D., 1928–1945 
Charles V. O'Hanley, 1945–1948 
A.L. McFadden, 1948–1961 
Donald C. Duffie, 1961–1975 
George W. Martin, 1975–1990 
Daniel W. O'Brien, 1990–2006
Michael W. Higgins, 2006–2009
Dennis Cochrane, C.M., 2010–2011
Dawn Russell, LL.M., 2011–2022
Kim Fenwick, Ph.D. (Acting), 2022—

Notable alumni

Notable faculty and staff
 T.J. Burke - first Indigenous person elected to a legislative assembly in Atlantic Canada and former Attorney General of New Brunswick
 Mike Eagles – former NHL hockey player
 Noël Kinsella – former Speaker of the Senate of Canada
 Kelly Lamrock – former provincial cabinet minister and Attorney General of New Brunswick
 Graydon Nicholas – first Indigenous Lieutenant Governor of New Brunswick, former judge, and first Indigenous law graduate from Atlantic Canada
 David Adams Richards – former writer-in-residence 
 Jan Wong – journalist and author

See also
 Higher education in New Brunswick
 List of universities in New Brunswick
 Atlantic University Sport
 Canadian Interuniversity Sport
 The Thomists (21-piece big band based at the university)

References

Further reading
 Fraser, J. A. "By Force of Circumstance": A History of St. Thomas University. Fredericton: Miramichi Press, 1970.
 Spray, William and Anthony Rhinelander. Church, Politics, and STU: The Relocation of St. Thomas University from Chatham to Fredericton. Fredericton, NB: STU, 2014.

External links

 
  STU Tommies Athletics

 
Education in Fredericton
Educational institutions established in 1910
Catholic universities and colleges in Canada
Buildings and structures in Fredericton
Universities in New Brunswick
1910 establishments in Canada